Jan Zaorski (6 May 1887 in Kraków – 10 March 1956 in Warsaw) was a Polish surgeon, a student of Ludwik Rydygier and Zygmunt Radliński. During the Occupation of Poland, he founded a conspiratory Vocational Public School for Assistant Sanitary Staff (Prywatna Szkoła Zawodowa dla Pomocniczego Personelu Sanitarnego).

In 1931, Zaorski became a director of the Elisabethan Hospital in Warsaw. In 1945, he became professor of Warsaw University. He was an author of more than 60 works, mainly about abdominal cavity surgery. He was also an author of scripts for students.

References
 
 

1887 births
1956 deaths
Polish surgeons
Physicians from Kraków
20th-century surgeons
Austro-Hungarian emigrants to the Russian Empire
Surgeons from the Russian Empire